The 2017 CWHL draft was the eighth in the history of the Canadian Women's Hockey League. It took place on August 20, 2017, marking the first time that the Draft involved Kunlun Red Star WIH, one of two expansion teams in the league,  who are also joined by the Vanke Rays.

The list of prospects for the Draft included goaltender Noora Raty from Finland, forward Alexandra Carpenter and Melodie Daoust. All three were participants in the 2014 Winter Olympics. Courtney Turner was selected with the first overall pick in the draft, claimed by the Boston Blades.

Top 10 picks

References

Canadian Women's Hockey League